Mowdaran (also Romanized as Mowdārān and Mūdārān; also known as Mey Khvārān and Meykhwrān) is a village in Avarzaman Rural District, Samen District, Malayer County, Hamadan Province, Iran. At the 2006 census, its population was 205, in 49 families.

References 

Populated places in Malayer County